is a three-part anime OVA that serves as a crossover between the Cyborg 009 and Devilman series. It was first screened  on 17 October 2015 and was released on 11 November 2015. The series inspired a manga adaptation and a prequel novel.  Netflix acquired the international streaming rights for the series.

Plot
Cyborg 009 and his team come into conflict with a mysterious threat that leads to Japan and take on Devilman in the process. After some misunderstandings, a secret team of Cyborgs designed by the evil Black Ghost, and a devil outbreak it's up to 009 and Devilman to prevent total annihilation.

Characters

Background

Before Go Nagai became the author of Devilman, he worked as an assistant to Shotaro Ishinomori, drawing backgrounds for the Cyborg 009 manga.  It was reported in Sankei Sports that he wished to do a collaboration with Ishinomori.

It was announced in March 2015 that a Cyborg 009 anime, directed by Jun Kawagoe, was in production to commemorate the 50th anniversary of the manga's debut.  It was later announced that the anime would receive a theatrical release in autumn.

Dynamic Planning separately announced a Devilman anime in April 2014, produced by animation studio Actas.  The project was scheduled for a fall 2015 release.

It was revealed in June 2015 that the two separately announced projects would in fact be a single crossover, titled Cyborg 009 VS Devilman.

Production
The anime is a three-part original video animation directed by Jun Kawagoe and written by Tadashi Hayakawa, with animation by the studios Bee Media and Actas.  JAM Project produced both the opening theme song, "Cyborg 009 ~Nine Cyborg Soldiers~", and the ending theme, "Devil Mind ~Ai wa Chikara~".also Kalafina with their third ending theme Lacrimosa.

Release
The first full trailer for the anime was released on 25 August 2015.

It was originally announced that the anime would have a two-week run in eight theaters; however, the number of theaters was later expanded to ten.  It debuted on 17 October 2015.

The complete set of three 30-minute episodes was released on Blu-ray on 11 November 2015.  The individual episodes were released on DVD separately on 11 November 2015, 9 December 2015, and 6 January 2016.

Netflix acquired the streaming rights to the series, streaming it in 20 languages in 190 countries.  The English dub was directed by Bob Buchholz and translated by Sachiko Takahashi.

Other media

Manga
A manga adaptation, titled , by Akihito Yoshitomi began serialization in Kodansha and Niconico's online magazine  between 14 October 2015 and 24 February 2016. The first chapter was also published with Monthly Shōnen Sirius on 26 October 2015. The manga was collected in one volume on 8 April 2016.

Novel
A prequel novel, written by Tadashi Hayakawa and titled , was published on 25 September 2015.

References

External links
  
 manga website 
 

Cyborg 009
Devilman
Actas
Crossover anime and manga
Dark fantasy anime and manga
Kodansha manga
Science fiction anime and manga
Shōnen manga
2015 anime OVAs